Klein Collins High School is a public high school located at 20811 Ella Boulevard in unincorporated Harris County, Texas, United States. The school, with a Spring, Texas postal address but outside of the Spring census-designated place, serves students in grades 9 through 12, as part of the Klein Independent School District. The  school sits on a  site.

The school serves several sections of unincorporated Harris County, including sections of Forest Ridge.

By board policy of the district, all senior high schools must have "Klein" as the first word of their names, in honor of Adam Klein. Klein Collins also honors Dr. Don Collins, superintendent of the Klein School District for 29 years.

The school's official student newspaper is the Legacy Press.

History
Klein Collins opened on August 9, 2001 with Ms. Mindy Spurlock as the opening principal. RWS Architects designed the now   campus and Marshall Construction Company, who received the contract to build Klein Collins on May 10, 1999, built the campus at an approximate cost of $52,000,000 exclusive of furniture and equipment. The campus, built in two separate phases, opened on August 9, 2001 with 1,092 students and a maximum capacity for 3,100 students.

In 2017 portions of the Klein Collins zone west of Kuykendahl Road are planned to be rezoned to Klein High School.

Demographics 
As of the 2020-21 school year, the school had an enrollment of 3,328 students. 15% of students were African American, 39.8% were Hispanic, 33.8% were White, 0.2% were American Indian, 7.3% were Asian, 0.1% were Pacific Islander, and 3.9% were Two or More Races. 39.7% of students were Economically Disadvantaged, 11.5% received Special Education, and 7% were English Learners.

Academics 
For the 2021-22 school year, the school received a B grade from the Texas Education Agency, with an overall score of 83 out of 100. The school received a B grade in two performance domains, Student Achievement (score of 86) and School Progress (score of 82), and a C grade in Closing the Gaps (score of 77). The school did not receive any of the seven possible distinction designations.

Feeder pattern 
The following elementary schools feed into Klein Collins:
 Benfer
 Haude
 Kreinhop
 Lemm
 Kuehnle (partial)
 Roth
 Zwink

The following intermediate schools feed into Klein Collins:
 Schindewolf
 Strack
 Hildebrandt

Notable alumni
 Bassel Bawji (born 1989), Lebanese-American basketball player
Austin Dean (born 1993), Major League Baseball outfielder for the San Francisco Giants
 Demetri Goodson (born 1989), former cornerback and currently college scout for the Green Bay Packers
 Mike Goodson (born 1987), running back for the New York Jets
 Tyler Naquin (born 1991), outfielder for the Cincinnati Reds
 Isaiah Spiller (born 2001), running back for Texas A&M
Allison Luff (born 1988), Broadway actress and singer, known for roles in Waitress and Wicked

References

External links

Klein Collins High School
Klein Independent School District
KCHS Tiger Tribune newspaper

High schools in Harris County, Texas
Educational institutions established in 2001
Public high schools in Texas
2001 establishments in Texas